Francis Lloyd (1748–1799), of Domgay, Llandysilio, Montgomeryshire, was a Welsh Member of Parliament.

He was a Member (MP) of the Parliament of Great Britain for Montgomeryshire
4 Apr. 1795 - 19 Feb. 1799.

References

1748 births
1799 deaths
18th-century Welsh people
People from Montgomeryshire